Eastern Refinery Limited or ERL is the sole country-owned oil refinery in Bangladesh. ERL, a subsidiary of Bangladesh Petroleum Corporation, plays a vital role in supplying around 40% of country's current petroleum products demand and thus maintains stability in petroleum, oil and lubricants (POL) products market of the country. ERL sometimes becomes the only fall back system available, to avoid products crisis in the face of disruption of products' import.

ERL as a profitable company in the public sector contributes substantially to the national exchequer in the form of dividend, taxes, VAT etc.

History 
Eastern Refinery was incorporated under Companies' Act 1913 as a public limited company in 1963 with 35% EPIDC's( East Pakistan Industrial Development Corporation) shares, 30% shares held by Burmah Oil Company and the rest 35% by private entrepreneurs. From November, 1985, Bangladesh Petroleum Corporation (BPC) became the 100% share holder of the company.

Refining facilities

Refinery went on-stream with three processing units:
 Crude Distillation Unit
 Catalytic Reforming Unit
 Hydrodesulphurization Unit
	
New process units added to original configuration:
 Asphaltic Bitumen Plant(Commissioned in December 1980)
 Long Residue Visbreaker Unit (Commissioned in December 1994)
 Mild Hydrocracker Unit (Hydrodesulphurization Unit revamped to MHC unit, commissioned in December 1994);
 MHC unit Converted to NGC (Natural Gas Condensate) unit, Commissioned in November 2007 by ERL Engineers

See also

Supermajors

References

External links
Official site
Bangladesh Petroleum Corporation official website

Oil refineries in Bangladesh
Government-owned companies of Bangladesh
1963 establishments in East Pakistan
Organisations based in Chittagong
Energy companies established in 1963